Franziska Martienssen-Lohmann, née Meyer-Estorf (6 October 1887 – 2 February 1971) was a German soprano who focused on  Lieder singing, and a voice teacher who gave master classes internationally, in collaboration with her husband. She wrote books about teaching singing which have remained standards in the field.

Life 
She was born Carolina Wilhelmine Franziska Meyer-Estorf in Bromberg in northern Poland, where she received vocal training. She studied piano in Leipzig with Robert Teichmüller, graduating in 1911. The following year, she married Carl Adolf Martienssen, a pianist and piano teacher. She studied voice in Berlin with Johannes Messchaert, and first appeared in concert in 1914.

She became known as a lieder singer in Germany and abroad. Divorced in 1927, she became a teacher at the Akademie der Tonkunst in Munich. She met Paul Lohmann (1894–1981), who became her closest colleague, and they married. From 1930 to 1945, she worked at the Akademie für Kirchen- und Schulmusik in Berlin, from 1945 to 1949 at the Musikhochschule Weimar, and from 1950 at the Robert Schumann Konservatorium in Düsseldorf. Together with her husband, she gave master classes in Potsdam, Salzburg, Lucerne and Scandinavia.

Her books about singing and voice training have remained standard textbooks.  Ausbildung der Gesangsstimme (The development of the singing voice) presented guidance, rather than rules, for singing. In three parts, it provides information about singing technique for beginners, a case history exemplifying points, and use of the voice in songs.  Der wissende Sänger – Gesangslexikon in Skizzen (The cognisant singer / Lexicon of singing in sketches) first appeared in Zürich in 1956 published by Atlantis Musikbuch, and was republished in 2010 by Schott. As its sub-title indicates, its 312 entries are ordered alphabetically. Lieder singer Dietrich Fischer-Dieskau wrote in his "Introduction" that he was "tempted to memorize whole sections of it for inspiration". He expressed a wish that non-musicians would also read it in order to become more aware of the "height and depth" of the singer's experience of singing. A review in English considered that the book was "very readable" with a "pleasant style", and recommended it to the general reader "interested in learning more about the complexities of the 'human' instrument."

Martienssen-Lohmann died in Düsseldorf aged 83. Sigrid Gloede and Ruth Grünhagen wrote a biography Franziska Martienssen-Lohmann – Ein Leben für die Sänger (... a life for the singers), published in 1993. Among her students are the contralto Hanna Ludwig and the tenor Hermin Esser.

Works 
Publications by Martienssen-Lohmann are held by the German National Library, including books about lieder singing, but also poems.

Awards 
 1958: Mozart Medal of the Mozart Society of Vienna

References

External links 
 
 
 
 

German sopranos
Voice teachers
1887 births
1971 deaths